The 1918 Nevada gubernatorial election was held on November 5, 1918. Incumbent Democrat Emmet D. Boyle defeated Republican nominee Tasker Oddie with 52.08% of the vote.

Primary elections
Primary elections were held on September 3, 1918.

Democratic primary

Candidates
Emmet D. Boyle, incumbent Governor
George B. Thatcher, Nevada Attorney General
Samuel M. Pickett
Ben D. Luce

Results

Republican primary

Candidates
Tasker Oddie, former Governor
William M. Kearney

Results

General election

Candidates
Emmet D. Boyle, Democratic
Tasker Oddie, Republican

Results

References

1918
Nevada
Gubernatorial